The meridian 158° west of Greenwich is a line of longitude that extends from the North Pole across the Arctic Ocean, North America, the Pacific Ocean, the Southern Ocean, and Antarctica to the South Pole.

The 158th meridian west forms a great circle with the 22nd meridian east.

It is the western boundary of continuous Class E airspace between 14, 500 feet and 18, 000 feet MSL (Mean Sea Level) over Alaska.

From Pole to Pole
Starting at the North Pole and heading south to the South Pole, the 158th meridian west passes through:

{| class="wikitable plainrowheaders"
! scope="col" width="130" | Co-ordinates
! scope="col" width="125" | Country, territory or sea
! scope="col" | Notes
|-
| style="background:#b0e0e6;" | 
! scope="row" style="background:#b0e0e6;" | Arctic Ocean
| style="background:#b0e0e6;" |
|-
| style="background:#b0e0e6;" | 
! scope="row" style="background:#b0e0e6;" | Chukchi Sea
| style="background:#b0e0e6;" |
|-
| 
! scope="row" | 
| Alaska
|-
| style="background:#b0e0e6;" | 
! scope="row" style="background:#b0e0e6;" | Bering Sea
| style="background:#b0e0e6;" | Bristol Bay
|-
| 
! scope="row" | 
| Alaska — Alaska Peninsula
|-valign="top"
| style="background:#b0e0e6;" | 
! scope="row" style="background:#b0e0e6;" | Pacific Ocean
| style="background:#b0e0e6;" | Passing just west of Nakchamik Island, Alaska,  (at ) Passing just east of Castle Cape, Alaska Peninsula,  (at ) Passing just east of Chankliut Island, Alaska,  (at )
|-
| 
! scope="row" | 
| Hawaii — Oahu island
|-valign="top"
| style="background:#b0e0e6;" | 
! scope="row" style="background:#b0e0e6;" | Pacific Ocean
| style="background:#b0e0e6;" | Passing just west of Kiritimati island,  (at )
|-
| 
! scope="row" | 
| Penrhyn Island
|-valign="top"
| style="background:#b0e0e6;" | 
! scope="row" style="background:#b0e0e6;" | Pacific Ocean
| style="background:#b0e0e6;" | Passing just east of Atiu island,  (at ) Passing just west of Mangaia island,  (at )
|-
| style="background:#b0e0e6;" | 
! scope="row" style="background:#b0e0e6;" | Southern Ocean
| style="background:#b0e0e6;" |
|-
| 
! scope="row" | Antarctica
| Ross Dependency, claimed by 
|-
|}

See also
157th meridian west
159th meridian west

References

w158 meridian west